Spring Side is a historic residence located just outside of Bellevue, Iowa, United States.  The house was influenced by the Gothic Revival "cottage" popularized by A.J. Davis and A.J. Downing.  It is sited on a hillside overlooking a valley and the Mississippi River.  The property is the source for three springs, hence its name from 1867.  Constructed in 1848 for William T. Wynkoop, a local businessman, the 2½-story stone building features steeply pitched gables trimmed with wooden scroll-work vergeboard and pendants with finials, and a gabled tower with the same decorative elements and lancet arch windows. Native limestone is its primary construction material.  The house originally had a wraparound porch that was removed.  It was listed on the National Register of Historic Places in 1990.

References

Houses completed in 1848
Gothic Revival architecture in Iowa
Houses in Jackson County, Iowa
National Register of Historic Places in Jackson County, Iowa
Houses on the National Register of Historic Places in Iowa